"B.B.D. (I Thought It Was Me)?" is a new jack swing song by Bell Biv Devoe. Released as the third single from the album Poison, it spent one week at number one on the US R&B chart, and peaked at number 26 on the Billboard Hot 100 pop chart.

See also
List of number-one R&B singles of 1990 (U.S.)

References

1990 singles
Bell Biv DeVoe songs
1990 songs
New jack swing songs